Dame Joan Dawson Bakewell, Baroness Bakewell,  (née Rowlands; born 16 April 1933), is an English journalist, television presenter and Labour Party peer. Baroness Bakewell is president of Birkbeck, University of London; she is also an author and playwright, and has been awarded Humanist of the year for services to humanism.

Early life and education
Bakewell was born on 16 April 1933 in Heaton Moor, Stockport, Cheshire, England, and moved to Hazel Grove before she was three. Both her grandfathers were factory workers: the Rowlands branch stemmed from the lead mining villages of the Ystwyth valley, in Wales. Her great-grandfather moved to Salford, where he was a preacher in the Church Army. Her grandfather was an iron turner.  On the maternal side, her grandfather was a cooper in Ardwick Brewery. The family lived in Gorton, a district of Manchester.

Bakewell was educated at Stockport High School for Girls, a grammar school in local authority control, where she became head girl. She won a scholarship and attended Newnham College at the University of Cambridge, where she studied Economics, then History, and joined the Marshall Society and the Mummers Acting Society.

Career

Broadcasting
Joan Bakewell began her career as a studio manager for BBC Radio, before moving into television. Bakewell then left after a year to try supply teaching. She then became an advertising copywriter with McCann Erickson, then with Hobson Bates, and later David Williams Ltd.  In the early 60s Bakewell was TV presenter for ATV’s Sunday Break, Southern Television’s Home at 4.30, BBC’s Meeting Point and the BBC series The Second Sex.

She first became known as one of the presenters of the BBC2 programme Late Night Line-Up (1965–72 and 2008). Frank Muir dubbed her "the thinking man's crumpet" during this period and the moniker stuck, but Bakewell herself dislikes the epithet. In 1968, she took the role of narrator of the BBC TV production of Cold Comfort Farm, a three-part serial, and played a TV interviewer in the 1960s film The Touchables.

Bakewell co-presented Reports Action, a Sunday teatime programme which encouraged the public to donate their services to various good causes, for Granada Television in 1976–78. In the 1970s Bakewell worked for both the BBC:  "Where is Your God?", "Who Cares" "The Affirmative Way" and  many Holiday Programmes between 1974 and 1978. Bakewell starred in 4 series of Granada’s pioneering Reports Action, a series that first encouraged the public to contribute goods and services to good causes.  Subsequently, she returned to the BBC, and co-presented a short-lived late-night television arts programme, briefly worked on the BBC Radio 4 PM programme, and was Newsnights arts correspondent (1986–88). Arts coverage was then dropped from news programmes in the era of John Birt's changes to the BBC. Bakewell switched to being the main presenter of the ethics documentary series Heart of the Matter, which she presented for 12 years. She resigned from the programme in 1999.

In 2001, Bakewell wrote and presented a four-part series for BBC Two called Taboo, a personal exploration of the concepts of taste, decency and censorship. The programme dealt frankly with sex and nudity and in some cases pushed the boundaries of what is permissible on mainstream television. Bakewell used frank language and "four-letter words" to describe pornography and sex toys. She watched a couple having sex while they were making a pornographic film and read out an "obscene" extract from the novel Tropic of Cancer by Henry Miller.

Taboo was referred to the Director of Public Prosecutions by the National Viewers' and Listeners' Association by then headed by John Beyer. Following the complaint, Bakewell faced the nominal prospect of being charged with blasphemous libel after she recited part of an erotic poem by James Kirkup concerning a Roman centurion's affection for Jesus, "The Love that Dares to Speak its Name". After its first publication in 1976, Denis Lemon, the editor of Gay News, had been given a nine-month suspended jail sentence. Bakewell later wrote that in the programme she "read this poem with extreme distaste and I hope that showed on my face." The Broadcasting Standards Commission rejected complaints from viewers.

On 26 May 2008, Bakewell introduced an archive evening on BBC Parliament called Permissive Night. The programme examined the liberalising legislation passed by Parliament in the late 1960s. Topics covered included changes to divorce law, the death penalty, the legalisation of abortion, the Race Relations Bill, the partial decriminalisation of homosexual acts (using editions of the documentary series Man Alive) and the relaxation of censorship. Permissive Night concluded with a special one-off edition of Late Night Line-Up which discussed the themes raised in the programmes over the course of the evening.

In 2009, she won the category Journalist of the Year at the annual Stonewall Awards.

In 2017, Bakewell was one of the minor hosts of the Channel 5 documentary series Secrets of the National Trust.

She presents Portrait Artist of the Year and Landscape Artist of the Year alongside Stephen Mangan for Sky Television.

Writing
Bakewell writes for the British newspaper The Independent in the 'Editorial and Opinion' section. Typically, her articles concern aspects of social life and culture but sometimes she writes more political articles, often focusing on aspects relevant to life in the United Kingdom. Formerly, from 2003, she wrote the "Just Seventy" column for The Guardian newspaper. In September 2008 she began a fortnightly column in the Times2 section of The Times.

Her first novel was published in March 2009 by Virago Press. All the Nice Girls drew on her experiences in war-time Merseyside to tell the story of a school "adopting" a ship.

Public roles
She is chairman of the theatre company Shared Experience.

It was announced in November 2010 that she would be awarded a life peerage, joining the Labour benches. She was created Baroness Bakewell, of Stockport in the County of Greater Manchester, on 21 January 2011, and formally introduced to the House of Lords on 25 January 2011 supported by fellow Labour peers Lord Puttnam and Baroness Kennedy.

In September 2017, Bakewell was elected co-chair of the All-Party Parliamentary Humanist Group, the cross-party group which represents humanists in Parliament.

Views and advocacy
In 2008, Bakewell criticised the absence of older women on British television. She said: "I think the fact that people are phased out, people like Moira Stuart and Selina [Scott] – out of the public eye – when they become a certain age is a real disadvantage to serious broadcasting. There's a whole segment of the British population that does not see its equivalent in serious broadcasting and that is women over 55. Now, that is not healthy for a broadcasting organisation's relationship with its audience. The public should be represented on the screen in various colours, forms, sexualities, whatever."

In 2010, Bakewell criticised the side effects of the sexual revolution of the 1960s. She said: "I never thought I would hear myself say as much, but I'm with Mrs Whitehouse on this one. The liberal mood back in the '60s was that sex was pleasurable and wholesome and shouldn't be seen as dirty and wicked. The Pill allowed women to make choices for themselves. Of course, that meant the risk of making the wrong choice. But we all hoped girls would grow to handle the new freedoms wisely. Then everything came to be about money: so now sex is about money, too. Why else sexualise the clothes of little girls, run TV channels of naked wives, have sex magazines edging out the serious stuff on newsagents' shelves? It's money that's corrupted us and women are being used and are even collaborating."

In August 2014, Bakewell was one of 200 public figures who were signatories to a letter to The Guardian expressing their hope that Scotland would vote to remain part of the United Kingdom in September's referendum on that issue.

In March 2016, she commented in The Sunday Times that anorexia is connected with a general narcissism in 21st century western culture, and that "no-one has anorexia in societies where there is not enough food". Despite agreement with her assessment in some media, her comments also provoked strong criticism from social and print media, and an apology for hurt caused from Bakewell herself.

In April 2020, during the COVID-19 pandemic, Bakewell said that the Government should stop treating the elderly like "a crazy old people's club" and let them work out how to keep safe from coronavirus themselves.

Honours
She was appointed a Commander of the Order of the British Empire (CBE) in the 1999 Birthday Honours and was Chairman of the British Film Institute from 2000 to 2002. She was promoted to Dame Commander of the Order of the British Empire (DBE) in the 2008 Birthday Honours.

In 2007 She was awarded the Honorary degree of Doctor of Letters (D.Litt) from the University of Chester. On 20 July 2011, Bakewell was made an honorary graduate at the University of Essex (DU Essex).

Bakewell has also received honorary degrees from Queen Margaret’s University Edinburgh (2005), Royal Holloway London,  University of the Arts (2008), Staffordshire University (2009), Lancaster University (2010), Newcastle University (2011), Open University (2010) and Manchester Metropolitan University (2013). She was made an Honorary Fellow of Newnham College, Cambridge in 2016.

In 2017, the charity Humanists UK awarded Bakewell its prize for Humanist of the Year, in recognition of her achievements in broadcasting and services to humanism and other good causes. In 2011 she was appointed Baroness Bakewell of Stockport.

Personal life
Bakewell's autobiography, The Centre of the Bed, was published in 2003 and concentrates on her experiences as a woman in the male-dominated media industry. It also details the extramarital affair Bakewell had with playwright Harold Pinter (between 1962 and 1969), while she was married to Michael Bakewell (the marriage lasted from 1955 to 1972) and Pinter was married to the actress Vivien Merchant. The affair was the basis for Pinter's 1978 play Betrayal, adapted in 1983 as a film. In 2017, Keeping in Touch, a play first written by Bakewell in 1978 in response to Betrayal, premiered on BBC Radio 4.

In 1975, she married Jack Emery, a British director, writer and producer for stage, TV and radio, who was 12 years her junior. The couple divorced in 2001. Bakewell said, "The age difference did matter, but other things mattered more."

In January 2023, Bakewell announced that she had been diagnosed with colon cancer.

Legacy 
The Joan Bakewell Archive is housed at the British Library. The papers can be accessed through the British Library catalogue.

References

External links

"Lost voices", John Mullan, The Guardian, 18 June 1999.
 Listen to an audio slideshow interview with Joan Bakewell talking about her first novel All the Nice Girls on The Interview Online.
 Joan Bakewell at Knight Ayton Management
Joan Bakewell Official Website

1933 births
Alumni of Newnham College, Cambridge
BBC newsreaders and journalists
BBC television presenters
English atheists
English humanists
English critics
English reporters and correspondents
English people of Welsh descent
BAFTA fellows
Dames Commander of the Order of the British Empire
English journalists
English television presenters
British women television presenters
Labour Party (UK) life peers
Life peeresses created by Elizabeth II
Living people
People from Stockport
People educated at Stockport High School for Girls
People associated with Birkbeck, University of London
British women television journalists
British women radio presenters
Honorary Fellows of the British Academy
Honorary Fellows of Newnham College, Cambridge
People associated with the University of Chester